Galactan endo-1,6-beta-galactosidase (endo-1,6-beta-galactanase) is an enzyme with systematic name endo-beta-(1->6)-galactanase. This enzyme catalyses the following chemical reaction

 Endohydrolysis of (1->6)-beta-D-galactosidic linkages in arabinogalactan proteins and (1->3):(1->6)-beta-galactans to yield galactose and (1->6)-beta-galactobiose as the final products

The enzyme specifically hydrolyses 1,6-beta-D-galactooligosaccharides with a degree of polymerization (DP) higher than 3.

References

External links 
 

EC 3.2.1